The Dassault Falcon 900, commonly abbreviated as the F900, is a French-built corporate trijet aircraft made by Dassault Aviation.

Development

The Falcon 900 is a development of the Falcon 50, itself a development of the earlier Falcon 20. The Falcon 900 design incorporates composite materials.

Other models include the Falcon 900-B, featuring an increased range, and the Falcon 900EX featuring other improvements in engines and range and an all-glass flight deck. The Falcon 900C is a companion to the Falcon 900EX and replaces the Falcon 900B. Later versions are the Falcon 900EX EASy and the Falcon 900DX. At EBACE 2008, Dassault announced another development of the 900 series: the Falcon 900LX, incorporating high mach blended winglets designed by Aviation Partners Inc.

In 2022, the 900LX equipped price was $44M.

Operational service

The Falcon 900 is used by the Transport Squadron 60 (Transportation, Training and Calibration Squadron 65), which is in charge of transportation for officials of the French state.

Variants

Announced in 1984. Original production. Powered by three 20 kN (4,500 lbf) Garrett TFE731-5AR-1C turbofan engines. It was certified in 1986 by French and U.S. aviation authorities.
Falcon 900 MSA
Maritime patrol version for Japan Coast Guard. This variant is equipped with search radar and a hatch for dropping rescue stores.
Falcon 900B
Revised production version from 1991. Powered by 21.13 kN (4,750 lbf) TFE731-5BR-1C engines.
Falcon 900C
Replacement for 900B. Introduced in 2000.

Long range version, with 22.24 kN (5,000 lbf) engines. This variant features TFE731-60 engines, with a range of 8,340 km (4,501 nm; 5,180 miles). Avionics by (Honeywell Primus). It entered service in 1996.
Falcon 900EX EASy
Long range version produced from 2004 to 2009. Fitted with Honeywell/Dassault Primus Epic EASy avionics. TFE731-60 engines.
Falcon 900DX
Shorter-range production type. TFE731-60 engines.
Falcon 900LX
Current production variant of EX fitted with blended winglets.
Envoy IV
RAF military designation for the 900LX.
VC-900A
Italian military designation for the 900EX.
VC-900B
Italian military designation for the 900EX EASy.

Operators

Civil operators

A wide range of private owners, businesses and small airlines operate Falcon 900s.

Military operators

Former operators

Accidents and incidents
 On 14 September 1999 a Falcon 900B operating for the Greek Government by Olympic Airways, and registered SX-ECH, was descending to land at Bucharest, Romania, when the autopilot disengaged and several pilot-induced oscillations occurred. The impact of unfastened passengers with the cabin and aircraft furniture resulted in fatal injuries to seven passengers, serious injuries to two and minor to another two. Among the victims was Giannos Kranidiotis, then deputy foreign minister for Greece.

Specifications (Falcon 900B)

See also

References

External links

 Dassault Falcon 900 page
 Airliners.net aircraft data sheet

Falcon 0900
1980s French business aircraft
Low-wing aircraft
Trijets
Cruciform tail aircraft
Aircraft first flown in 1984